"Reverend Black Grape" is a song which was released in May 1995 by UK band Black Grape. It was the first single to be  taken from their debut album It's Great When You're Straight... Yeah and peaked at #9 in the UK chart.

The song was co-produced by Danny Saber and Stephen Lironi. It was written by Shaun Ryder and released by Radioactive Records. The sample "Would he agree that a stately minuet would be preferable to the rain dance" is taken from Sir Thomas Arnold asking a question of John Major in the House of Commons in 1994

Controversy 

The song caused mild controversy when released because of its assertion that Pope Pius XII collaborated with the Nazis: "Oh Pope he got the Nazis, To clean up their messes, In exchange for gold and paintings, he gave them new addresses". In addition, the song contains a brief audio clip of Adolf Hitler at one of his rallies. The lyrics also borrow from the traditional hymn O come all ye faithful.

Track listing 
CD Single
 "Reverend Black Grape" – 5:13
 "Reverend Black Grape (Dub Collar Mix)" – 5:45
 "Reverend Black Grape (The Dark Side Mix)" – 4:46

CD Maxi Single
 "Reverend Black Grape" – 5:13
 "Straight Out Of Trumpton (Basement Tapes)" – 4:06
 "Reverend Black Grape (The Dark Side Mix)" – 4:46

References

1995 debut singles
Britpop songs
1995 songs
Radioactive Records singles
Songs critical of religion
MCA Records singles
Black Grape songs